Mabrouk Jendli (born 6 March 1992) is a Tunisian footballer who plays as a defender.

References

External links
 

1992 births
Living people
Tunisian footballers
Tunisian expatriate footballers
US Tataouine players
CA Bizertin players
US Ben Guerdane players
Ohod Club players
Tunisian Ligue Professionnelle 1 players
Saudi First Division League players
Expatriate footballers in Saudi Arabia
Tunisian expatriate sportspeople in Saudi Arabia
Association football defenders